Gaius Avidius Nigrinus (died 118 AD) was a Roman senator who lived between the 1st and 2nd centuries. Nigrinus served as suffect consul for the nundinium of April to June 110 with Tiberius Julius Aquila Polemaeanus as his colleague.

Ancestry 
Nigrinus’ ancestors were Romans of the highest political rank: he was the son of an elder Gaius Avidius Nigrinus, and his uncle was the consul Titus Avidius Quietus. Nigrinus’ family was wealthy, distinguished and well-connected politically in Faventia (modern Faenza, Italy), where he was born and raised. Nigrinus and his family may have been related to Gaius Petronius Pontius Nigrinus, who was consul in the year 37.

His family had strong links to Greece. The father of Nigrinus had served as Proconsul of Achaea during the reign of Emperor Domitian (81-96), as had his paternal uncle. His family was friendly with Pliny the Younger and Plutarch, the latter of whom dedicated ‘On Brotherly Love’ to the elder Nigrinus and Quietus.

Career 
The earliest known office Nigrinus held was as plebeian tribune in 105; Ronald Syme raises the possibility that he is the Nigrinus Pliny the Younger praises for his speech indicting Varenus Rufus for corruption during his administration of Bithynia and Pontus. Nigrinus later became proconsular governor of Achaea, although it is unclear during what years this was; this was probably part of Trajan’s attempt to recognize and stabilize the administration of the financially troubled province. 

Nigrinus was a trusted lieutenant of the Emperor Trajan. During the year of his consulship, Trajan sent Nigrinus to Delphi, Greece as a member of an advisory council to assist the future historian Arrian in settling boundary disputes. This event is recorded in Delphi, where there are honorific inscriptions dedicated to Nigrinus in Greek and Latin.

Following his consulate, Nigrinus was appointed governor of Dacia; he held this office from 113 until his death.

In 117, Trajan died and he was succeeded by his paternal second cousin Hadrian. In the summer of 118, Nigrinus was executed at Faventia on orders of the Senate. According to the Historia Augusta Nigrinus was one of four senators who plotted to kill Hadrian while he was sacrificing, while adding that Hadrian had intended to make Nigrinus his heir apparent; the other three senators were Aulus Cornelius Palma, Lucius Publilius Celsus, and Lusius Quietus. It is possible that Hadrian could have viewed Nigrinus as a potential threat, given his previous high standing and close relationship with Trajan. Anthony Birley mentions the suggestion that Hadrian may have later felt remorse for this act, thus explaining why Hadrian adopted Nigrinus' son-in-law, Ceionius Commodus (who later, following his adoption of Marcus Aurelius, took the name Lucius Aelius). However, Birley also suggests Hadrian adopted Commodus out of "sheer perversity -- Hadrian's desire to infuriate other aspirants."

Family 
Nigrinus is known to have had two wives. The name of his first wife is not known, but their daughter Avidia married Ceionius Commodus; together they had a son, the future Lucius Verus, co-emperor with Marcus Aurelius. His second wife Plautia, had previously been married to Lucius Ceionius Commodus (ordinary consul 106), and after Nigrinus' death married Sextus Vettulenus Civica. Plautia and Nigrinus had a daughter, Avidia Plautia, who had two children, Lucius Titius Plautius Aquilinus (ordinary consul 162) and Plautius Quintillus (ordinary consul 159).

References

Sources
Matthew Bunson, A dictionary of the Roman Empire 1995
C. Konrad, Plutarch's Sertorius: A Historical Commentary Chapel Hill: University of North Carolina Press, 1994
Alan K. Bowman, Peter Garnsey, Dominic Rathbone, The Cambridge ancient history, Volume 11, 2nd Edition 2000
Anthony Richard Birley, The Roman Government of Britain Oxford, 2005
Anthony R. Birley, "Hadrian and Greek Senators", Zeitschrift für Papyrologie und Epigraphik, 116 (1997), pp. 209–245
http://penelope.uchicago.edu/Thayer/E/Roman/Texts/Historia_Augusta/Aelius*.html#2.8
http://penelope.uchicago.edu/Thayer/E/Roman/Texts/Historia_Augusta/Lucius_Verus*.html

2nd-century Romans
Roman governors of Achaia
Suffect consuls of Imperial Rome
Roman governors of Dacia
Nigrinus, Gaius
118 deaths
1st-century births

Year of birth unknown
Executed ancient Roman people
People executed by the Roman Empire